Holotrichia is a genus of beetle in the family Scarabaeidae, which are well known as "chafer beetles" or "white-grubs" for their white larvae that are found under the soil where they feed on the roots of plants.

Particularly well known species include Holotrichia serrata which is a serious problem in sugarcane cultivation and Holotrichia consanguinea which is a problem in groundnut cultivation.

List of species

  H. acuticollis 
  H. akolana 
  H. amamiana 
  H. andamana 
  H. andrewesi 
  H. anthracina 
  H. aritai 
  H. atkinsoni 
  H. barbata 
  H. behrensi 
  H. bengalensis 
  H. bhutanensis 
  H. bicolorata 
  H. brenskeiana 
  H. brunneipennis 
  H. burmanica 
  H. calliglypta 
  H. canlaonensis 
  H. carinata 
  H. carmelita 
  H. ceylonensis 
  H. cochinchina 
  H. consanguinea 
  H. convexifrons 
  H. convexopyga 
  H. costulata 
  H. dalatensis 
  H. danielssoni 
  H. danjoensis 
  H. dannymohagani 
  H. deliana 
  H. deplanata 
  H. desiderata 
  H. diomphalia 
  H. disparilis 
  H. dohrni 
  H. dolini 
  H. dorsalis 
  H. dubiosa 
  H. ebentera 
  H. egregia 
  H. ernesti 
  H. farinosa 
  H. fissa 
  H. freyi 
  H. furcifer 
  H. gaoligongshanicus 
  H. gebleri 
  H. geilenkeuseri 
  H. glabriclypeata 
  H. glabrifrons 
  H. gressitti 
  H. guandaoshana 
  H. hankowiensis 
  H. helleri 
  H. herwangshana 
  H. heterodactyla 
  H. heterotincta 
  H. hirsuta 
  H. holovestita 
  H. horishana 
  H. inducta 
  H. insecata 
  H. intermedia 
  H. intersa 
  H. iridescens 
  H. iridipennis 
  H. kanarana 
  H. kandulawai 
  H. karschi 
  H. kaszabi 
  H. kiotonensis 
  H. koraiensis 
  H. kulzeri 
  H. kunmina 
  H. kwatungensis 
  H. laevigata 
  H. langeri 
  H. lata 
  H. laticeps 
  H. liukueinsis 
  H. longicarinata 
  H. longilamellata 
  H. longiuscula 
  H. loochooana 
  H. luangia 
  H. madurensis 
  H. magna 
  H. marginicollis 
  H. mausonia 
  H. mizusawai 
  H. montana 
  H. montivaga 
  H. mucida 
  H. murzini 
  H. nagpurensis 
  H. nathani 
  H. nicobarica 
  H. nigrescens 
  H. nigricollis 
  H. nigrofusca 
  H. nilgiria 
  H. nilgirina 
  H. notaticollis 
  H. nubiliventris 
  H. oblita 
  H. obscura 
  H. occipitalis 
  H. ochrogaster 
  H. omeia 
  H. opacipennis 
  H. opuana 
  H. ovata 
  H. pagana 
  H. parallela 
  H. parva 
  H. parvioculata 
  H. perotteti 
  H. picea 
  H. pilifrons 
  H. pilipyga 
  H. pinguis 
  H. plagiata 
  H. planipennis 
  H. plumbea 
  H. problematica 
  H. pruinosella 
  H. pruinosipennis 
  H. pubifemorata 
  H. pulvinosa 
  H. pygidialis 
  H. quinquefoliata 
  H. remorata 
  H. repetita 
  H. reynaudi 
  H. richteri 
  H. rosettae 
  H. rotundiceps 
  H. rubida 
  H. rufescens 
  H. rufina 
  H. rufodorsalis 
  H. rufoflava 
  H. rufofulva 
  H. rufula 
  H. rufus 
  H. rugans 
  H. rugaticollis 
  H. rugatifrons 
  H. rugifrons 
  H. rustica 
  H. sakuraii 
  H. sauteri 
  H. schereri 
  H. schmitzi 
  H. sculpticollis 
  H. sculptifrons 
  H. scutata 
  H. scutulata 
  H. semihirta 
  H. semiserrata 
  H. semitomentosa 
  H. senegalensis 
  H. serrata 
  H. serraticollis 
  H. seticollis 
  H. setiventris 
  H. setosa 
  H. severini 
  H. sharpi 
  H. shibatai 
  H. shishona 
  H. siamensis 
  H. sichotana 
  H. signatifrons 
  H. sikkimana 
  H. similis 
  H. simillima 
  H. sjoestedti 
  H. sororia 
  H. subrugipennis 
  H. sumatrana 
  H. szechuanensis 
  H. teinzoana 
  H. tenasserima 
  H. tetarana 
  H. tjibodasia 
  H. tokara 
  H. truncata 
  H. tuberculata 
  H. umbrata 
  H. undulata 
  H. ungulata 
  H. vernicata 
  H. vethi 
  H. vietnamensis 
  H. wangerbaoensis 
  H. weyersi 
  H. wiebesi 
  H. yamayai 
  H. yui 
  H. yunnana

References

Scarabaeidae genera
Melolonthinae
Insect pests of millets